Jacques Le Vieux, dit Vieau (or Vieaux) (May 5, 1757 – July 1, 1852) was a French-Canadian fur trader and the first permanent white settler in Milwaukee, Wisconsin. He was born near Montreal, Quebec, Canada and died in Howard, Wisconsin.

Biography
In , Vieau came to Green Bay, where he married Angelique Roy that same year. She was the granddaughter of Potawatomi Indian chief Anaugesa. They had at least twelve children together.

In 1795, Vieau settled at Jambo Creek in Manitowoc County. While employed by the North West Company, Vieau established a fur trading post in the area that would become Milwaukee in 1795, along with outposts at Kewaunee, Manitowoc, and Sheboygan. His Milwaukee cabin was built on top of a bluff overlooking the Menomonee Valley and became his winter residence away from Green Bay. A historical monument marks this location in Mitchell Park as the first house in Milwaukee.

In 1818, Vieau hired another French-Canadian named Solomon Juneau, who later married his daughter Josette and went on to found what was to become the City of Milwaukee.

In 2016, a tombstone for his grave was placed.

Legacy
The town of Louisville, Kansas is named after Vieau's son, Louis Amable Vieau, Sr.

Vieau is the eponym of Vieau Elementary School and also a street found in Milwaukee, Wisconsin.

The living descendants of Vieau are centered on Green Bay.

Notes

External links
 Narrative of Andrew Vieau, Sr.
 The Menomonee Valley: History
 Highlights of History in Wisconsin

1757 births
1852 deaths
American people of Québécois descent
Canadian fur traders
American fur traders
American people of Canadian descent
People from Milwaukee
People from Green Bay, Wisconsin